Elliott Davidson (born 30 October 1994 in Macclesfield) is an Irish canoe slalom athlete who has competed since the age of 13. His results to date include a making the Irish U23 canoe slalom team for 2013 and then both the U23 & senior team for 2014 & 2015. He also has a UK ranking 2015 of 18th.

References

External links 
 Official Website

 

Living people
1994 births
Irish male canoeists
Sportspeople from Macclesfield